The Arkansas State Auditor (formally known as the Auditor of State) is a constitutional officer within the executive branch of the U.S. state of Arkansas. Thirty-five individuals have occupied the office of state auditor since statehood. The incumbent is Dennis Milligan, a Republican who took office in 2023.

Powers and duties
In Arkansas, the state auditor serves as the general accountant or "bookkeeper" of state government. As such, the auditor is responsible for preauditing claims against the state, issuing warrants on the state treasury in payment of claims approved, enforcing the state's unclaimed property laws, accounting for monthly revenues, expenditures, and cash balances by fund, and administering payroll for state legislators, elected executive branch officials and the judiciary.

While the state auditor is the general accountant for the state, he or she is not the state's comptroller, which in the public sector is typically responsible for statewide financial accounting and reporting. That role is instead performed by the Department of Finance and Administration, which operates under the direction and supervision of the governor. Similarly, the state auditor does not conduct financial or performance postaudits of state agencies and local governments. Rather, that is the job of the Division of Legislative Audit, whose head is appointed by and reports to the state legislature.

History
The auditor's office was created on July 4, 1819, when Arkansaw Territory was created from the Missouri Territory. All constitutional officers of Arkansas were appointed by a joint session of the General Assembly of Arkansas Territory, except the governor. Upon statehood in 1836, the position took the current name. When the Arkansas Constitution of 1868 was ratified during the Reconstruction era, direct election of constitutional officers was among the reforms listed in the new document. Auditors were elected to four-year terms in partisan elections. This system remained in place when the Arkansas Constitution of 1874 was adopted, which remains in effect today.

Prior to Amendment 63 in 1982, the term length for constitutional offices in Arkansas, including Auditor, was two years.

List of Arkansas State Auditors

Notes

References

External links 
Auditor of State - Arkansas Official Website

 
1836 establishments in Arkansas
Arkansas